Little Cheyenne Creek is a stream in the U.S. state of South Dakota.

Little Cheyenne Creek was used as a stopping place of the Cheyenne Indians, hence the name.

See also
List of rivers of South Dakota

References

Rivers of Potter County, South Dakota
Rivers of South Dakota